Tadmor or Tadmur is an ancient Semitic name, and may refer to

Places
Tadmor, the native name of the ancient city of Palmyra, Syria
Tadmor, the native name of Palmyra (modern), Syria
Tadmur District, Syria
Tadmor Castle in Palmyra
Tadmor Prison Palmyra
Tadmor, Ohio a former town in the United States
Tadmor River in New Zealand

Surame
Eitan Tadmor, American mathematician
Hayim Tadmor, Israeli assyriologist
Zehev Tadmor Israeli chemical engineer

Other
Tadmor (planet), the exoplanet Gamma Cephei Ab

See also

Tadmore, Saskatchewan